Visvanathar Temple Temple is a Hindu temple dedicated to the deity Shiva, located at Kunniyur in Tiruvarur district in Tamil Nadu (India).

Vaippu Sthalam
It is one of the shrines of the Vaippu Sthalams sung by Tamil Saivite Nayanar Sambandar and Appar.

Presiding deity
The presiding deity is represented by the lingam known as Visvanathar. The Goddess is known as Visalakshi.

Location
In inscriptions this place is known as Arumozhideva Valanattu Kundriyur.
It is located at a distance of 10 km in Tiruvarur in Thiruthuraipoondi road.

References

Hindu temples in Tiruvarur district
Shiva temples in Tiruvarur district